Castlelost is a townland in County Westmeath, Ireland. The townland is located in the civil parish of Castlelost. The R446 regional road runs through the middle of the area, and a section of the R400 regional road links the townland with the M6 motorway. The western side of the town of Rochfortbridge lies in the townland, with the east laying in the neighbouring townland of Rahanine.

St. Joseph's School, and the Church of the Immaculate Conception stand in the townland, serving the town of Rochfortbridge and the surrounding townlands.

The townland is bordered by Castlelost West and Clontytallon to the west, Derry to the north, Farthingstown and Oldtown to the south and Gortumly and Rahanine to the east.

The townland is recorded on the Griffith Valuation in 1868, with 37 tenants living in the area.

Castlelost Castle 

A ruined castle dating back to the Norman invasion of Ireland is situated in the north of the townland.

References 

Townlands of County Westmeath